This is a list of the top-selling albums in New Zealand for 2011 from the Official New Zealand Music Chart's end-of-year chart, compiled by Recorded Music NZ.

Chart 

Key
 – Album of New Zealand origin

References

External links 
 The Official NZ Music Chart - albums

2011 in New Zealand music
2011 record charts
Albums 2011